1789 ballet premieres, List of
Lists of ballet premieres by year
Lists of 1780s ballet premieres